Bronwyn Law-Viljoen is a South African writer, editor, publisher and professor. She is the co-founder of the publisher Fourthwall Books and owns a bookstore called Edition. She acts as the primary editor for works on law and history of South Africa and the architecture and building process of its constitutional court structures, along with artistic book publications of the work of William Kentridge. She has also published her own novel called The Printmaker.

Education 
Law-Viljoen has an MA degree (1994) from Rhodes University in South Africa, a PhD in Literature (2003) from New York University and a PhD in Creative Writing (2017) from the University of the Witwatersrand in Johannesburg, South Africa.

Career

Author
Law-Viljoen's first novel, The Printmaker, was published in 2016 (Umuzi/Penguin Random House). It was shortlisted for the premier fiction prize in South Africa for the Sunday Times Barry Ronge Fiction Award, and won the 2018 English Academy of South Africa Olive Schreiner Prize. It appeared in French in 2019 (Editions Zoé).

Academic
Law-Viljoen is an associate professor, the head of the Department of Creative Writing and the deputy head of the School of Literature, Language and Media at the University of the Witwatersrand in Johannesburg, South Africa.

Editor
Law-Viljoen was the editor of the arts magazine Art South Africa and editor-in-chief at David Krut Publishing in Johannesburg. Prior to that, she completed an internship at the independent photography publishing company, Aperture, in New York.

She is the editor and co-founder of Fourthwall Books, an independent publisher of books on art and photography established in South Africa in 2010. By 2020, the company had published 41 books and won several important awards: the 2010 Jane Jacobs Best Urban Book Award (New York) for Writing the City into Being; the 2011 Antalis Paper Loves You Award for Fire Walker; the 2015 Jan Rabie Rapport Prize for Non-Fiction for Nagmusiek; the 2015 Kyknet Rapport Prize for Fiction for Nagmusiek; the 2016 Eugene Marais Prize for Nagmusiek; and the Sunday Times Alan Paton Award 2019 for Everyone is Present. Through Fourthwall Books, she has been involved in the editing and publishing of a number of authors' works, including Flute by William Kentridge, Light on a Hill with contributions by multiple architects, builders, and court judges that Law-Viljoen helped to compile, and Art and Justice on the history and conception of the constitutional court in South Africa.

She also opened her own bookstore called Edition in Milpark, Johannesburg as an extension of her publishing company.

Bibliography

Novels 
 The Printmaker (2016, Umuzi/Penguin Random House), translated as Le Graveur (2019, Editions Zoé)

Books edited 
 Fire Walker: William Kentridge, Gerhard Marx (with Oliver Barstow, 2011, Fourthwall Books)
 William Kentridge Nose: Thirty Etchings (2010, David Krut Publishing)
 Art and Justice: The Art of the Constitutional Court of South Africa (2008, David Krut Publishing)
 William Kentridge Flute (2007, David Krut Publishing)
 Light on a Hill: Building the Constitutional Court of South Africa (2006, David Krut Publishing)
 William Kentridge Prints (2006, David Krut Publishing)

Awards and honours 
 2018: Olive Schreiner Prize from the English Academy of South Africa, for The Printmaker
 2017: The Printmaker shortlisted for the Sunday Times Barry Ronge Fiction Award
 2001: Americanist Molberger Prize for Literature of the Transition
 1996–1998: Fulbright Scholarship, New York University

References

External links  
Staff profile at University of the Witwatersrand
 Author profile at Researchgate
 Author profile at penguinrandomhouse.co.za

South African women academics
South African women editors
South African women novelists
21st-century South African women writers
Rhodes University alumni
New York University alumni
University of the Witwatersrand alumni
Academic staff of the University of the Witwatersrand
Year of birth missing (living people)
Living people